"No One Can Stop Us Now" was a single released by the English football team Chelsea in 1994, for reaching the 1994 FA Cup Final. It reached number 23 in the UK Singles Chart.

Opponents Manchester United also released a song, Come On You Reds, which reached number 1.

External links
 No One Can Stop Us Now on YouTube

References

1994 singles
Chelsea F.C. songs
1994 songs
Song articles with missing songwriters